QCI may refer to:
 QoS Class Identifier, a mechanism to ensure proper Quality of Service for bearer traffic in LTE networks 
 Quadratic configuration interaction, an extension of configuration interaction in quantum physics
 Queen Charlotte Islands, an archipelago on the North Coast of British Columbia, Canada